Lachowo  is a village in the administrative district of Gmina Kolno, within Kolno County, Podlaskie Voivodeship, in north-eastern Poland.

The village has a population of 506.

References

Lachowo
Łomża Governorate
Białystok Voivodeship (1919–1939)
Belastok Region